Ellsworth Avenue is located in the Shadyside neighborhood of Pittsburgh, Pennsylvania. It is mostly a commercial street that has locally owned businesses, galleries, restaurants, and bars. It runs southwest-northeast, parallel to Walnut Street, another commercial street, and is bounded by Shady Avenue to the east and South Neville Street to the west. Ellsworth Avenue is one of Shadyside's three business districts, along with South Highland Avenue and Walnut Street.

Several Pittsburgh Historic Landmarks line Ellsworth Avenue. At the corner of Neville and Ellsworth is the Church of the Ascension, an episcopalian church that was named a landmark in 1971. Colonial Place is a mansion designed by George S. Orth that became a landmark in 1898. Roslyn Place (a wood-paved street) and Ellsworth Terrace are also landmarks located here.

History

The street was named for Colonel Elmer Ellsworth, the first Union officer killed in the Civil War.

A mural was painted on a west-facing wall of 5883 Ellsworth Ave to commemorate Margo Lovelace’s contribution to the arts in the region.

Businesses
Ellsworth Avenue's locally owned businesses include Eons and Hey Betty, two vintage and resale clothing stores, GalleriE CHIZ and Mendelson Gallery, two art galleries, and beauty salons such as Salon 5844, and Capristo Salon. Other businesses include Itt’s Dogg’n It, a beer store, Petagogy, a local pet supply store, the East End Veterinary Medical Centre, Tokyo Japanese Food Store, a laundromat called the Laundry Factory, and Steel City Improv Theater.

Ellsworth has a number of restaurants such as Senyai Thai Kitchen, and Umi and Soba, which are part of the big Burrito Restaurant Group. A food chain located on Ellsworth is the first Crazy Mocha Coffee Company.

Ellsworth also features two of Pittsburgh's gay and gay friendly bars, Element and 5801 Video Lounge and Cafe. Another popular bar is Harris Grill, which has "bacon night" on Tuesdays.

Pedestrian bridge

In 2008, the Urban Redevelopment Authority approved a design by Sheila King for a footbridge to connect businesses in the Eastside of Shadyside with Ellsworth Avenue and Spahr Street.

The bridge connects Ellsworth Avenue with several businesses in the Eastside, including MCN Salon, Whole Foods Market, Pure Barre, Chipotle Mexican Grill, and Fine Wine & Good Spirits.

Martin Luther King Jr. mural
There is a 100-foot-long mural dedicated to Martin Luther King Jr. at the corner of Ellsworth Avenue, near the busway stop in East Liberty, that was created in the summer of 2007. The mural begins at Ellsworth, goes along Shady Avenue, and ends at Penn Avenue. The idea for the mural started with local Pittsburgh artist Kyle Holbrook. 

The mural panels were funded by local foundations including The Heinz Endowments, Grable Foundation, Pittsburgh Foundation, Laurel Foundation, August Wilson Center for African American Culture, Multicultural Arts Initiative and National City Bank.

Gallery

References

External links

 ThinkShadySide.com

Streets in Pittsburgh